Valmiki Nagar Lok Sabha constituency is one of the 40 Lok Sabha (parliamentary) constituencies in Bihar state in eastern India. This constituency came into existence in 2008, following delimitation of the parliamentary constituencies based on the recommendations of the Delimitation Commission of India constituted in 2002.

Assembly segments
This constituency comprises the following six Vidhan Sabha (legislative assembly) segments:

Members of Parliament

^ by-poll

Election results

2020 by-election
Bye-elections were needed due to the death of the sitting MP, Baidyanath Prasad Mahto. Sunil Kumar, Mahto's son won the by-election.

2019 general election

2014 general elections

2009 general elections

See also
 Bagaha (Lok Sabha constituency)
 West Champaran district
 List of Constituencies of the Lok Sabha

Notes

References

External links
Valmiki Nagar lok sabha  constituency election 2019 result details

Lok Sabha constituencies in Bihar
Politics of West Champaran district